Lundberg is a surname of Swedish origin. Lundberg means "wooded hill" or "mountain grove". Notable people with the surname include:

A
Agneta Lundberg (born 1947), Swedish Social Democratic politician
Alfred Lundberg (1852–1935), Swedish silent film actor
Amadeus Lundberg (born 1989), Finnish singer
Arne Lundberg (1925–1993), Swedish Scout leader

B
Brian Lundberg (born 1960), former National Hockey League player
Britt Lundberg (born 1963), Finnish politician in the Åland Islands

C
Carin Lundberg (born 1944), Swedish politician

E
Ebbot Lundberg (born 1966), lead singer of the Swedish rock band The Soundtrack of Our Lives
Emil Lundberg (born 1982), professional Swedish ice hockey Centre
Emma Lundberg, Swedish cell biologist
Erik Lundberg (1907–1987), Swedish economist
Evelyn Lundberg Stratton (born 1953), American jurist

F
Ferdinand Lundberg (1905–1995), American economist and journalist
Filip Lundberg (1876–1965), Swedish actuary
Fred Børre Lundberg (born 1969), Nordic combined skier
Fredrik Lundberg (born 1951), Swedish businessman

G
Gabriel Lundberg (born 1994), Danish basketball player
George A. Lundberg, (1895–1966) American sociologist
George D. Lundberg (born 1933), American physician 
George G. Lundberg (1892–1981), American pilot 
Godfrey Lundberg (1879–1933), American engraver 
Gust E. Lundberg (1920–1977), American businessman
Gustaf Lundberg (1695–1786), Swedish rococo pastelist and portrait painter

H
 Henrik Lundberg (disambiguation), multiple people

I
 Inger Lundberg (1948–2006), Swedish politician

J
Jennifer Palm Lundberg (born 1986), Miss World Sweden 2008
John Lundberg (born 1968), English artist and documentary filmmaker
Johnny Lundberg (born 1982), Swedish professional football defender
Jon Lundberg (born 1961), American politician

K
Kevin Lundberg (born 1952), American politician
Knud Lundberg (1920–2002), Danish sportsperson
Kristian Lundberg (1966–2022), Swedish author
Kristina Lundberg (born 1985), Swedish ice hockey player

L
Lisa Lundberg, Swedish sprint canoeist who competed in the early 1950s

M
Mark Lundberg (1958–2008), American opera singer
Martin Lundberg (born 1990), Swedish professional ice hockey player
Mikael Lundberg (born 1973), Swedish golfer

O
Odd Lundberg (1917–1983), Norwegian speed skater

P
Praya Lundberg (born 1992), Thai actress and model

R
Ragnar Lundberg (1924–2011), Swedish athlete who competed mainly in the pole vault

S
Sigfrid Lundberg (1895–1979), Swedish road racing cyclist
Stefan Lundberg (born 1989), American soccer player
Stina Lundberg Dabrowski, (born 1950), Swedish journalist

U
Ulla-Lena Lundberg (born 1947), Finland-Swedish author

V
Victor Lundberg (1923–1990), American radio personality
Viktor Lundberg (born 1991), Swedish footballer

See also
Charles Lundberg Three-Decker, historic triple decker in Worcester, Massachusetts
Lundberg Bakery (Austin, Texas), historic bakery building in downtown Austin, Texas
Lundberg Family Farms, based in Richvale, California, produces, packages, and markets organic foods
Lundberg lag, the lag between changes in the demand and response in output
Schwegman, Lundberg, Woessner & Kluth, intellectual property law firm
Lundbergs, shortened form of the Swedish financial services company L E Lundbergföretagen

Swedish-language surnames